Touhami Sebie (born 3 May 1988) is an Algerian footballer. He is currently playing for CA Bordj Bou Arréridj in the Algerian Ligue Professionnelle 1.

External links
 DZFoot Profile
 

1988 births
Living people
Algerian footballers
AS Khroub players
USM Blida players
Algerian Ligue Professionnelle 1 players
JS Saoura players
Association football defenders
21st-century Algerian people